An industrial and provident society (IPS) is a body corporate registered for carrying on any industries, businesses, or trades specified in or authorised by its rules.

The members of a society benefit from the protection of limited liability much like other corporate forms, but unlike companies for example, each member will normally only have one vote at a General Meeting regardless of their shareholding. The governance of a society is therefore democratically oriented rather than financially oriented.

The legal form originated in the United Kingdom of Great Britain and Ireland and became the traditional legal form taken by trading organisations with democratic governance including:

 co-operatives (which trade for the benefit of their members);
 societies for the benefit of the community (which trade for the benefit of the broader community).

In Great Britain the Co-operative and Community Benefit Societies Act 2014 has renamed these societies as co-operative or community benefit societies.

The term industrial and provident society is still used in statute in New Zealand, the Republic of Ireland and within the UK in Northern Ireland.

History 1852 to 2014

The first legislation basis for industrial and provident societies arose in the Industrial and Provident Societies Partnership Act 1852.

The consolidated Industrial and Provident Societies Act was passed by the parliament of the United Kingdom of Great Britain and Ireland in 1893, and was amended in 1895 and 1913.

This legislation still forms the basis of the law on societies in the Republic of Ireland.

The Industrial and Provident Societies Act was passed by the parliament of New Zealand in 1908, and forms the basis of the law on societies in New Zealand.

In 1965, an act of Parliament came into effect called the Industrial and Provident Societies Act 1965.

In 2006, the Friendly and Industrial and Provident Societies Act 1968 (Audit Exemption) (Amendment) Order 2006 increased the audit exemption threshold level for industrial and provident societies to £5.6 million. Also the Charities Act 2006 removed certain exemptions of charitable IPSs in England and Wales. From that point, charitable IPSs had to register with both the FCA and the Charity Commission, except registered social landlords, who register with the Tenant Services Authority.

Since 2010 the IPS laws explicitly name co-operatives in their titles. The 'Industrial and Provident Societies Act 1965' was renamed 'Co-operative and Community Benefit Societies and Credit Unions Act 1965'.

In 2011, the Legislative Reform (Industrial and Provident Societies and Credit Unions) Order 2011 increased the maximum shareholding limit, changed the date of submission of the annual return, permitted children to be members, and allows the publication of unaudited interim accounts.

In January 2012, the UK Prime Minister, David Cameron announced a project to consolidate all the legislation applicable to industrial and provident societies to be passed by 2015.  There was some uncertainty as to how far new developments would address the problems with the legislation. Cameron stated, "We know that breaking monopolies, encouraging choice, opening up new forms of enterprise is not just right for business but the best way of improving public services too." Ed Mayo, Secretary General of Co-operatives UK, welcomed the project. In mid-2012, revision of laws for co-operative was in its early stages. Some felt the reforms did not deal with certain key problems.

Changes to the registration system under the Financial Services Act 2012 which splits the Financial Services Authority into the Financial Conduct Authority (FCA) and the Prudential Regulation Authority (PRA) took effect on 1 April 2013. The registration function for societies was transferred to the FCA while the prudential regulation of credit unions was transferred to the PRA. In September 2013, the English and Scottish Law Commissions published a draft consolidation bill and related documents for consultation. Earlier that year, the UK Treasury, which is the department responsible for legislation for societies, published a series of proposals to increase the holding limit for withdrawable share capital in societies to at least £31,000, to apply insolvency rescue procedures to societies, and to change the rules applicable to their registers of members. Draft regulations linked to that consultation were also available, having been circulated to a small number of people. Those drafts and other materials, including a private member's bill to liberalise the use of share capital by societies presented to the UK House of Lords were explained and brought together online.

In 2014, the Co-operative and Community Benefit Societies Act 2014 was given royal assent.

Regulation
In the United Kingdom, IPSs were registered (but not regulated) by the Financial Conduct Authority (FCA), which took over the job from the Registrar of Friendly Societies when it was part of the Financial Services Authority (FSA) (both being supervised by the Treasury). Note that IPS registration is quite separate from the FCA's function of regulating financial institutions.

Such businesses have been controlled in the past by the Industrial and Provident Societies Partnership Act 1852, the Industrial and Provident Societies Act 1893, and the Industrial and Provident Societies Act 1965.

The legislation in the Republic of Ireland is based on modifications of the UK Industrial and Provident Societies Act 1893.

Legislation

 Industrial and Provident Societies Partnership Act 1852
 Industrial and Provident Societies Act 1893
 Industrial and Provident Societies (Amendment) Act 1913
 Co-operative and Community Benefit Societies and Credit Unions Act 1965
 Industrial and Provident Societies Act 2002
 Co-operative and Community Benefit Societies Act 2003
 Co-operative and Community Benefit Societies and Credit Unions Act 2010
 Financial Services Act 2012
 Co-operative and Community Benefit Societies Act 2014

Forms of financial capital: Community shares

Unlike a company limited by guarantee, an IPS generally has a share capital. However, in a not-for-profit IPS the share capital may be limited to a nominal amount. Both types of IPS have a share capital, but it is usually not made up of equity shares like those in a company limited by shares, which appreciate or fall in value with the success of the enterprise that issues them. Rather they are par-value shares, which can only be redeemed (if at all) at face value. The profits and losses of an IPS are thus the common property of the members. The share typically acts as a "membership ticket", and voting is on a "one member one vote" basis. The maximum individual withdrawable shareholding is currently set at £100,000 (although other IPSs may hold more shares than this). The Legislative Reform Order (Industrial & Provident Societies and Credit Unions) Order 2011 removed the limit for non-withdrawable shares. Since 2006, the FCA has been willing, in principle, to permit societies to have non-user investor members providing certain conditions are met and this, in combination with the removal of the £100,000 holding limit for non-withdrawable shares, may open up wider possibilities for co-operatives to raise finance from investors while maintaining user control.

It may be withdrawable share capital, an unusual form of finance which is treated as equity but may be withdrawn subject to specified conditions, and is relatively cheap for small co-operatives to raise as it is exempt from certain regulations applicable to conventional share issues regarding the publication of a prospectus. However, an IPS with withdrawable share capital is not allowed to carry on a banking business, presumably because a withdrawable share capital would make it impractical to ensure capital adequacy requirements are continuously met.

Since 2012, the use of withdrawable share capital by community benefit societies has been commonly described as 'community shares'. Over £150 million has been raised in community shares by over 440 community owned businesses across the UK. Recent research has shown that this model has proven very resilient, with 92% of all businesses who have raised capital through community shares still trading to date. As community share offers are exempt from formal regulation, the Community Shares Unit (CSU) oversees best practice standards, intelligence and development of the community shares market. The CSU is a formal partnership between Co-operatives UK, Locality and The Plunkett Foundation.

In depth guidance on the legislation and best practice standards on running community share offers is available from The Community Shares Handbook.

Examples

Community benefit societies
 Broadband 4 Rural North
 F.C. United of Manchester
 Hull United A.F.C.
 Fordhall Community Land Initiative
 Greater Manchester Tree Station
 Manchester United Supporters' Trust
 RLLMUK

Co-operatives
 Ethical Consumer Research Association
 Shared Interest

Housing Associations 

 Canopy Housing
 Empty Homes Agency
 Great Places
 Hannover Housing Association
 Home Group
 Stonewater Ltd.
 Whitefryars Housing Group

See also
Community interest company

References

External links
shares.coop - The Community Shares Marketplace
Community Shares directory
Industrial & Provident Societies, Financial Services Authority
FSA Mutuals Public Register - searchable, Financial Services Authority

Co-operatives in the United Kingdom
Legal entities
Types of business entity
Charity law
Finance